The Harmanec Tunnel is a railway tunnel on the Banská Bystrica - Dolná Štubňa railway. It was built from 1936 to 1940.

See also
Bujanov Tunnel

Sources
On the ridge of the Greater Fatra

Railway tunnels in Slovakia
Tunnels completed in 1940